YTW may refer to
Yield to worst, a variant of yield to maturity
Yutian Wanfang Airport, IATA code YTW